State Road 155 (SR 155) is a north–south route in Tallahassee.

State Road 155 is signed over a portion of Meridian Road in northern Tallahassee; the rest of the road is County Road 155.

Major intersections

References

155
155
Transportation in Tallahassee, Florida